Olafs Daugulis is an American chemist, currently the Robert A. Welch Chair of Chemistry at the University of Houston.

References

Year of birth missing (living people)
Living people
University of Houston faculty
21st-century American chemists